Ruth Pinto de Souza (May 12, 1921 – July 28, 2019) was a Brazilian actress.

Biography
As a member of the Black Experimental Theater (Teatro Experimental do Negro, TEN), she is one of the first Black actresses in dramatic theater in Brazil and one of the first to perform at the Teatro Municipal do Rio de Janeiro. The Black Experimental Theater was created in 1944 in Rio de Janeiro, Brazil, to combat racism and create opportunities for Black talent in theater. Along with other Afro-Brazilians women, Ruth participated in the premiere performance of TEN as a member of the chorus and later played the Native Woman, the only female character in Eugene O'Neill's play The Emperor Jones. She was awarded with Prêmio Saci.

She died in Rio de Janeiro in the neighbourhood of Copacabana in July 2019 at the age of 98.

Tribute
On May 12, 2021, Google celebrated her 100th birthday with a Google Doodle.

Selected filmography

 Terra Violenta (1948)
 Falta Alguém no Manicômio (1948) as Júlia
 Também Somos Irmãos (1949) as Rosália
 A Sombra da Outra (1950)
 Terra É Sempre Terra (1951) as Bastiana
 Ângela (1951)
 The Landowner's Daughter (1953) as Sabina
 Candinho (1954) as Manuela
 Quem Matou Anabela? (1956)
 Osso, Amor e Papagaio (1957)
 Ravina (1958)
 Fronteiras do Inferno (1959)
 Macumba Love (1960) as Mama Rata-loi
 A Morte Comanda o Cangaço (1960) as Praying Woman
 Bruma Seca (1960)
 Favela (1961)
 O Assalto ao Trem Pagador (1962) as Judith
 Gimba, Presidente dos Valentes (1963) as Chica Maluca
 0' Cabeleira (1963)
 As Cariocas (1966) (segment "Roberto Santos")
 O Homem Nu (1968)
 O Bem-Amado (1973, TV Series) as Chiquinha do Parto
 Um Homem Célebre (1974)
 Pureza Proibida (1974)
 Pontal da Solidão (1974) as Narração
 Ana, a Libertina (1975)
 Quem Matou Pacífico? (1977)
 Ladrões de Cinema (1977)
 Fruto do Amor (1981) as Dra. Elza
 Jubiabá (1986)
 A Grande Arte (1991) as Old Woman Kissing (uncredited)
 Boca (1994) as Mrs. Esteban
 A Glass of Rage (1999)
 Aleijadinho - Paixão, Glória e Suplício (2000) as Joana Lopes
 O Clone (2001, TV Series) as Dona Mocinha da Silva
 Filhas do Vento (2004) as Maria Aparecida (Cida)
 Em Quadro (2009)
 O Vendedor de Passados (2015) as Dona Célia
 Primavera (2018) as Josephina / Matilda / Madre Amélia

References

External links

1921 births
2019 deaths
Actresses from Rio de Janeiro (city)
Afro-Brazilian people
Brazilian television actresses
Brazilian telenovela actresses
Brazilian film actresses
Afro-Brazilian actresses
Brazilian stage actresses
20th-century Brazilian actresses
21st-century Brazilian actresses